NSE Indices Limited (formerly known as India Index Services & Products Limited (IISL)), a subsidiary of the National Stock Exchange of India (NSE), provides a variety of indices and index related products and services to Indian capital markets. It is based in Mumbai, Maharashtra. NSE Indices Ltd. operates as a subsidiary of NSE Strategic Investment Corporation Limited. The company maintains over 100 equity indices comprising broad-based benchmark indices, sectoral indices, fixed income and customized indices.

There are many investment and risk management products, index funds and exchange traded funds benchmarked to indices developed by NSE Indices Ltd. in India and abroad including derivatives traded on NSE, NSE IFSC Ltd., and SGX. 

NSE Indices Ltd. was formed with the objective of providing a variety of indices and index related products and services to capital markets.

Broad-market indices

Sectoral indices

References

Indian stock market indices
1998 establishments in Maharashtra
Indian companies established in 1998